The men's 4 × 100 metres relay event at the 1960 Olympic Games took place between September 7 and September 8.

Results

Heats

The fastest three teams in each of the four heats advanced to the semifinal round.

Heat one

Heat two

Heat three

Heat four

Semifinals

The fastest three runners in each of the two heats advanced to the final round.

Heat one

Heat two

Final
The United States team (of Frank Budd-Ray Norton-Stone Johnson-Dave Sime) finished first in a world record time of 39.4 s but were disqualified because at the first exchange from Budd to Norton, Norton started too early and the exchange happened outside the changeover box. The West German team who finished second in 39.5 s received the gold medals and became the new world record holders.

Key: WR = world record; =WR = equalled world record; DQ = disqualified; * = competed in heats only

References

M
Relay foot races at the Olympics
4 × 100 metres relay
Men's events at the 1960 Summer Olympics